Capão do Leão is a Brazilian municipality in the southern part of the state of Rio Grande do Sul. The population is 25,409 (2020 est.) in an area of 785.37 km². The city hosts the main campus of Universidade Federal de Pelotas, the largest higher education institution in the southern portion of Rio Grande do Sul.

Bounding municipalities
Pelotas
Rio Grande
Morro Redondo
Cerrito
Pedro Osório
Arroio Grande

References

External links
 Official website of the town hall
 https://web.archive.org/web/20070930210757/http://www.citybrazil.com.br/rs/arroiogrande/ 

Municipalities in Rio Grande do Sul
Pelotas (micro-region)